The following is a list of the American television networks and announcers who have broadcast NASCAR's annual Daytona 500 throughout the years. Throughout its history, the Daytona 500 has been aired on all four major networks in the U.S., including ABC, CBS, NBC, and Fox. In 1979, CBS covered the race live flag-to-flag for the first time. The unprecedented broadcast was considered risky by network executives, but was a rousing success when a snowstorm blanketed much of the east coast, prompting a huge viewing audience. An exciting and shocking finish capped off a telecast that was considered a ground-breaking moment in the history of NASCAR, and one of the defining moments that helped elevate the sport into the mainstream.

Currently, Fox holds exclusive rights to carry the Daytona 500 in the United States, under the terms of contract extensions that run through the 2024 NASCAR season. As part of the package, Fox also holds the exclusive rights to support events held during Daytona 500 Speedweeks, including the Clash, Daytona 500 pole qualifying, the Duels, the Truck Series race, the Xfinity Series race, and the respective practice sessions. Some of the ancillary events are aired on Fox companion channels FS1 and FS2.

Early CBS and ABC's Wide World of Sports era (1959–1978)
The first known telecast of a NASCAR race was the 1960 Daytona 500, parts of which was presented as part of CBS Sports Spectacular, with announcer Bud Palmer.

From 1962 to 1978, the Daytona 500 was shown on ABC's Wide World of Sports. During the 1960s and early 1970s, the race was filmed and an edited highlight package aired the following weekend. In 1974, ABC began the first semi-live coverage (joined-in-progress) of the Daytona 500. Coverage was normally timed to begin when the race was halfway over. Brief taped highlights of the start and early segments were shown, then ABC joined the race live already in progress, picking up approximately the last 90 minutes of the race. This format continued through 1978.

The 1976 race was held on the same day of the final day of competition in the Winter Olympics (also broadcast on ABC). ABC carried 30 minutes of live coverage of the start of the race, then switched to the Olympics for 90 minutes to carry taped coverage of the final two competitive events (a cross-country ski race and the final runs in the bobsled), held earlier that day. Then it was back to Daytona for about an hour-and-a-half for the finish.

During the period on Wide World of Sports, the booth announcers typically served as roving pit reporters during the running of the race, as well as interviewing in victory lane. The booth commentary was recorded in post-production.

CBS era (1979–2000)
In 1979, CBS instituted the live "flag-to-flag" coverage policy. The ground-breaking 1979 broadcast ushered in the 22-year run of NASCAR on CBS. The 1987 broadcast won the Sports Emmy for "Outstanding Live Sports Special." Ken Squier served as play-by-play announcer from 1979 to 1997. In 1998, former pit reporter Mike Joy was promoted to play-by-play, while Squier moved to the host position.

The 1995 race includes a two-hour rain delay that occurred near the midpoint. Some markets in the U.S. did not have the race, as CBS lost major market affiliates during the 1994-95 season.

During its entire run from 1979-2000, CBS also carried the Busch Clash (live), and in most years, carried the Twin 125s (tape-delayed). In the mid-1990s, CBS also picked up coverage of the Goody's 300, while pole qualifying for the Daytona 500 was aired on ESPN during much of the 1990s.

Since 1996, U.S. television ratings for the Daytona 500 have been the highest for any auto race of the year, surpassing the traditional leader, the Indianapolis 500. The 2006 Daytona 500 attracted the sixth largest average live global TV audience of any sporting event that year with 20 million viewers.

Fox/NBC era (2001–2006)
From 2001 to 2006, the Daytona 500 broadcasting network alternated between Fox and NBC under the terms of a six-year, $2.48 billion, centralized NASCAR television contract. Previously, television rights deals for races were negotiated by the individual track owners. Beginning in 2001, the television contract would now be administered by the sanctioning body. Fox carried the Daytona 500 in odd-numbered years (2001, 2003, 2005), and NBC carried the Daytona 500 in even-numbered years (2002, 2004, 2006). The Pepsi 400 in July followed the opposite pattern, going to the network not airing the Daytona 500 in the respective season.

Rights to other support events held during Speedweeks followed the same general pattern, alternating between Fox/FX (odd years) and NBC/TNT (even years). Ancillary events included the Budweiser Shootout, Daytona 500 pole qualifying, the Gatorade 125s, as well as coverage of "Happy Hour" practice and other practice sessions. The Busch Series race followed the same pattern, however, the Truck Series race was aired by ESPN for two seasons as part of a different contract, before it switched to Speed Channel, who also aired the Goody's Dash Series race in 2002-2004, taking over from FX in 2001 (although in 2004 the Dash Series was no longer sanctioned by NASCAR).

In 2001, after CBS lost the rights to the Daytona 500, Ken Squier left the network and joined Fox for a one-race arrangement as special contributor and studio host.

Exclusive Fox era (2007–present)
Starting in 2007, Fox became the exclusive home of the Daytona 500 under the terms of NASCAR's new television package. Contract extensions signed in 2011 and 2012 extended the exclusive rights on Fox through the 2024 season.

Notes
2007
Race finished in prime-time hour (7 PM EST).
Per the current broadcast agreements, the Daytona 500 will be televised by Fox through 2022.
2010: Two delays totaling 150 minutes caused by track break up. Finished in prime-time.
2012: John Roberts replaced Chris Myers, who was placed on bereavement leave after his son's death during Speedweeks.  Race delayed 30 hours by rain, then delayed a second time after a Lap 160 red flag caused by track issues following a jet fuel fire as a result of a crash.  Race finished in late night hour (1 AM EST Tuesday / 10 PM PST Monday), after Fox typically signs off.
2014:  Race finished in late-night hour (11 PM EST)  and in prime-time (8 PM PST because of rain delays totaling 6 hours, 22 minutes.
2015: Race extended to 203 laps,  due to a green-white-checker finish, Race got underway after oil dumped on the track.
2016
Jeff Gordon replaced Larry McReynolds in the booth for the race, as McReynolds moved to the studio.
Race is the first Daytona 500 to be broadcast live in virtual reality.

See also
 Daytona 500
 NASCAR on television and radio

References

Sources
Daytona 500 numbers game.
Daytona 500 Ratings: Danica Lifts Overnights to Seven-Year High Daytona 500 Ratings: Danica Lifts Overnights to Seven-Year High
NASCAR 'Daytona 500' TV Ratings History + Your Guess For This Year (Poll)

Broadcasters
ABC Sports
CBS Sports
Fox Sports announcers
NBC Sports
Wide World of Sports (American TV series)
CBS Sports Spectacular
Lists of NASCAR broadcasters
Florida sports-related lists